St. Wilfrid's Church may refer to any of a number of structures in England:

St Wilfrid's Church, Alford, Lincolnshire
St Wilfrid's Church, Barrow-upon-Trent, Derbyshire
St Wilfrid's Church, Brighton, East Sussex
St Wilfrid's Church, Bognor Regis, West Sussex
St Wilfrid's Church, Burgess Hill, West Sussex
St Wilfrid's Church, Calverton, Nottinghamshire
St Wilfrid's Chapel, Church Norton, Selsey, West Sussex
St Wilfrid's Church, Davenham, Cheshire
St Wilfrid's Church, Egginton, Derbyshire
St Wilfrid's Church, Grappenhall, Cheshire
St Wilfrid's Church, Hailsham, East Sussex
St Wilfrid's Church, Halton-on-Lune, Lancashire
St Wilfrid's Church, Halton, Leeds, West Yorkshire
St Wilfrid's Church, Harrogate, North Yorkshire
St Wilfrid's Church, Haywards Heath, West Sussex
St Wilfrid's Church, Hickleton, South Yorkshire
St Wilfrid's Church, Hulme, Manchester
St. Wilfrid's Church, Kelham, Nottinghamshire
St. Wilfrid's Church, Kirkby-in-Ashfield, Nottinghamshire
St Wilfrid's Church, Low Marnham, Nottinghamshire
St Wilfrid's Church, Melling, Lancashire
St Wilfrid's Church, Mobberley, Cheshire
St Wilfrid and St Ann's Church, Newton Heath, Greater Manchester
Church of St Wilfrid, Northenden, Manchester
St. Wilfrid's Church, North Muskham, Nottinghamshire
St Wilfrid's Church, Preston, Lancashire
St Wilfrid's Church, Ribchester, Lancashire
St Wilfrid's Church, Ripon, North Yorkshire
St Wilfrid's Church, Screveton, Nottinghamshire
St Wilfrid's Church, Scrooby, Nottinghamshire
St. Wilfrid's Church, South Muskham, Nottinghamshire
St Wilfrid's Church, Standish, Greater Manchester
St Wilfrid's Church, Wilford, Nottinghamshire